Neygenan (also Romanized as Neygenān and Nīganan; also known as Nagīneh, Nāgīnu, Nakīneh, and Nīgnān) is a village in Ali Jamal Rural District, in the Central District of Boshruyeh County, South Khorasan Province, Iran. At the 2006 census, its population was 331, in 112 families.

References 

Populated places in Boshruyeh County